Abu'l-Ḥasan Aḥmad ibn Jaʿfar al-Barmakī al-Nadīm (839 – June/July 936), surnamed Jaḥẓa and al-Ṭunbūrī, was a descendant of the Barmakid family, and a well-known scholar, singer, poet, and courtier of his time.

He was reportedly born in 839, the grandson of Musa ibn Yahya and great-grandson of the famous Yahya al-Barmaki, the vizier of Harun al-Rashid. The historian Charles Pellat describes him as "a man of very varied culture, but little religion, of doubtful morals and repulsive appearance"; he was nicknamed  by the Abbasid prince and poet Ibn al-Mu'tazz, on account of his bulging eyeballs. He nevertheless was a prominent member of the courtly society of his time, and appears in multiple anecdotes, associating with the grandees of the Abbasid Caliphate's court. Little of his work survives, apart from a few poems; most of them are known through a list in the 10th-century compendium al-Fihrist, and include treatises on astrology, lute-playing, cooking, and a biography of Caliph al-Mu'tamid. He died at Wasit in June/July 936.

References

Sources
 

839 births
936 deaths
9th-century people from the Abbasid Caliphate
10th-century people from the Abbasid Caliphate
Barmakids
Courtiers of the Abbasid Caliphate
10th-century Arabic poets
10th-century Arabic writers
Poets from the Abbasid Caliphate